The Blasensandstein is a Carnian geologic member in Bavaria, Germany. It is part of the Hassberge Formation. Fossil theropod tracks have been reported from the formation.

See also 
 List of dinosaur-bearing rock formations
 List of stratigraphic units with theropod tracks

References

Bibliography 
  

Geologic formations of Germany
Triassic System of Europe
Triassic Germany
Carnian Stage
Sandstone formations
Lacustrine deposits
Ichnofossiliferous formations
Paleontology in Germany